John Andrew Cutting (15 April 1924 – 24 April 1985) was an English professional footballer who played as an inside forward in the Football League.

References

Sources

1924 births
1985 deaths
People from Fleetwood
English footballers
Association football inside forwards
Fleetwood Town F.C. players
Accrington Stanley F.C. (1891) players
Oldham Athletic A.F.C. players
English Football League players